Joe E. Warren (September 17, 1912–December 23, 2003) was an American politician who served in the Kansas State Senate as a Democrat from 1957 to 1988.

References

1912 births
2003 deaths
Democratic Party Kansas state senators
People from Cowley County, Kansas
20th-century American politicians